Novoallaberdino (Yañı Allabirźe) is a rural locality (a village) in Muraptalovsky Selsoviet, Kuyurgazinsky District, Bashkortostan, Russia. The population was 19 as of 2010. There is 1 street.

Geography 
Novoallaberdino is located 44 km south of Yermolayevo (the district's administrative centre) by road. Kopyly is the nearest rural locality.

References 

Rural localities in Kuyurgazinsky District